Angelinoceras is a genus of lituitids from the Middle Ordovician that starts off with an open spiral of about 1.5 strongly compressed whorls followed by a straight orthoconic section that continues to expand for a length about equal to the diameter of the coiled portion before retaining a more or less consistent diameter. The juvenile spiral portion has a deep indentation on the ventral side of the aperture for the water-jet funnel, known as a hyponomic sinus, that becomes broad and shallow in the straight-shelled adult portion.

Angelinoceras is most likely derived from Holmiceras by a further opening of the initial spiral and a reduction in the expansion of the orthocone.

References

Flower, R. H. 1950. A Classification of the Nautiloidia. Jour Paleontology, V.24, N.5, pp 604–616, Sept.
Furnish & Glenister, 1964. Nautiloidea -Tarphycerida. Treatise on Invertebrate Paleontology Part K, Mollusca 3 ...Nautiloidea

Prehistoric nautiloid genera